Claire's Camera is a 2017 drama film written, produced, and directed by Hong Sang-soo and starring Isabelle Huppert and Kim Min-hee. It was shown in the Special Screening section of the 2017 Cannes Film Festival and released in France on 7 March 2018.

Plot
While working for a Korean film distribution company at the Cannes Film Festival, Jeon Man-hee is pressured to quit her job after her boss, Nam Yang-hye, tells her that she no longer trusts Man-hee, refusing to elaborate on why she feels this way. In fact, the firing took place because she had sex with director So Wan-soo during the festival. Man-hee decides to remain in Cannes for the time being.

Claire, a French teacher who has traveled to Cannes with a friend to attend a screening of her film, has a chance encounter with Director So at a cafe. She brings him to a local library and teaches him to recite a French poem. Although not a professional artist, Claire is an avid photographer who takes photos with her instant camera. While at dinner with So and Yang-hye, she shares her photos, including a photo she took earlier the same day of Man-hee. So and Yang-hye are confused at the circumstances of the photo, particularly why Man-hee is wearing more makeup than usual. Later, after Claire has left, it is revealed that So and Yang-hye have a romantic relationship, possibly contributing to Man-hee’s firing. So ends the relationship, claiming that he wants to ensure that their business relationship is not jeopardized.

Later, Claire meets Man-hee after taking her photo at the beach. During their conversation, Claire mentions that she has never eaten Korean food; Man-hee offers to cook for her. Man-hee brings Claire back to the apartment hotel she is staying at with her coworkers, where they share a meal. Claire shares about her encounter with So and Yang-hye, leading Man-hee to understand the circumstances of her dismissal.

Man-hee again meets So by chance at a hotel, who accosts her for her clothing. Claire, who is also there, takes a photo of Man-hee, upsetting her. Man-hee later brings Claire to the cafe where her firing took place. Claire takes a photo of Man-hee, telling her that she takes photos because the only way to change things is to “look at everything again, very slowly.” Claire shares with Man-hee about the death of her boyfriend months prior. Yang-hye comes to Man-hee’s apartment to meet with her. While their conversation is not depicted, Man-hee is seen back at work.

Cast
Isabelle Huppert as Claire
Kim Min-hee as Jeon Man-hee
Chang Mi-hee as Nam Yang-hye
Jung Jin-young as Director So Wan-soo
Yoon Hee-sun
Lee Wan-min
Kang Taeu
Mark Peranson
Shahira Fahmy

Production
In May 2016, it was announced Isabelle Huppert, Kim Min-hee, Jung Jin-young and Chang Mi-hee joined the cast of the film, with Hong Sang-soo directing the film. It was shot during the 2016 Cannes Film Festival.

Release
In August 2017, Cinema Guild acquired U.S. distribution rights to the film; it was released on 9 March 2018.

Critical reception
On review aggregator website Rotten Tomatoes, the film holds an approval rating of 90% based on 40 reviews, and an average rating of 7.6/10. The website's critical consensus reads, "Claire's Camera adds another deceptively unassuming entry to writer-director Hong Sang-soo's oeuvre — one whose lingering impact belies its brief length." On Metacritic, the film has a weighted average score of 80 out of 100, based on 15 critics, indicating "generally favorable reviews".

Awards and nominations

See also
Isabelle Huppert on screen and stage

References

External links
Cinema Guild official site

2017 drama films
2017 films
Films directed by Hong Sang-soo
French drama films
2010s French-language films
2010s Korean-language films
English-language South Korean films
South Korean drama films
2010s English-language films
2010s French films
2010s South Korean films